= Larymna (Caria) =

Historical site in modern Turkey

Coordinates: 36°36′30″N 28°00′27″E

Larymna (Ancient Greek: Λάρυμνα) was a town of ancient Caria.

Its site is located near Incirli Ada, Asiatic Turkey.
